Home Coming is a 2022 Chinese drama film directed by  and starring Zhang Yi, Wang Junkai and Yin Tao. The film picks up the story of two unarmed Chinese diplomats delving into a rebel force-controlled area in the war-wrecked Republic of Numea to lead 125 Chinese citizens safely back to China. The film premiered in China on 30 September 2022.

Cast
 Zhang Yi as Zong Dawei
 Wang Junkai as Cheng Lang
 Yin Tao as Bai Hua
 Wang Xun as Liu Minghui
 Li Xuejian as the Chinese ambassador
  as Yan Xingzhou, Chinese counsellor.
  as Secretary
 Wan Qian as Chen Yue
 Khalid Ghanem 
 Li Chen
 Wang Zhi
 Chen Haoyu

Production
Production started in April 2022 and ended on August 23. The Republic of Numea, a war-wrecked African country, was constructed in Yinchuan, capital of northwest China's Ningxia Hui Autonomous Region.

Soundtrack

Release
Home Coming was theatrically released on 30 September 2022 in China.

References

External links

2022 films
2020s Mandarin-language films
Chinese war drama films
Films about diplomats
Films set in Africa
Films shot in Ningxia
2022 war drama films